This is an alphabetical list of known Hindi songs performed, sung and/or recorded by Mohammed Rafi between 1942 and 1980. Over 5,000 of his songs are listed here. Mohammed Rafi also sang in several different languages other than Hindi such as Punjabi, Marathi etc. Some of which are also listed here.

S 

(279)										
					
 "Shahab leke woh" - Thaliritta kinaakkal 1980 Malayalam Lyrics-Ayish Kamal,Music-Jithin Shyam
 "Sa Re Ga Ma (Duet Kishore Kumar - S. D. Burman/Anand Bakshi) - Chupke Chupke 1975"								
 "Saahil Jo Dubo De Kashti Ko (Solo - Krishna Dayal/Amar N. Khanna) - Baawara 1950"										
 "Saajan Yeh Mat Jaaniyo (Duet Lata Mangeshkar - Sardar Malik/Bharat Vyas) - Saranga 1960"										
 "Saal Mubarak Saheb Ji (New Year, Friendship Duet Mukesh - Ravindra Jain/Unknown) - Do Jasoos 1975"										
 "Saanson Mein Kabhi Dil Mein Kabhi (Duet Asha Bhosle - R. D. Burman) - Parchayian 1972"										
 "Saanson Mein Kabhi, Dil Mein Kabhi, Nazaron Mein Raha Kabhi, Jag Bairi Ho To Kya, Tum Hum Se Wafa Karna (Duet Asha Bhosle - R. D. Burman/Majrooh Sultanpuri) - Parchhaiyan 1972"										
 "Saanwariya Bansiwala (Duet AmirBai - Shyam Babu Pathak/Bharat Vyas) - Janmashtami 1950"										
 "Saare Sheher Mein Aap Sa Koi Nahin (Duet Asha Bhosle - Kalyanji-Anandji/Anand Bakshi) - Bairaag 1976"										
 "Saari Umran Dey Pay Gey Wichoray (Duet Shamshad Begum - Hansraj Behl/Unknown) - Do Lachchiyan ****"      (Punjabi Film)										
 "Saat Ajube Is Duniya Mein Aathavi Apni Jodi 1 (Duet Mukesh - Laxmikant-Pyarelal/Anand Bakshi) - Dharam Veer 1977 and Evergreen Mohd Rafi ****"										
 "Saat Ajube Is Duniya Mein Aathavi Apni Jodi 2 (Duet Mukesh - Laxmikant-Pyarelal/Anand Bakshi) - Dharam Veer 1977"										
 "Saath Do Dil Ka Hua Tha (Solo - Chitragupt/Anjum Jaipuri) - Hamari Shaan 1951"										
 "Saath Hum Tum Chale The Yahin To Kahin (Duet Asha Bhosle - Sonik-Omi/Vishweshwar Sharma) - Ladki Jawan Ho Gayi 1977"										
 "Saath Jiyenge Saath Marenge (Solo - Sardar Malik/Bharat Vyas) - Saranga 1960"										
 "Saathi Banega, Saath Apne Chalega Jo, Rahe Na Rahe Woh, Uska Naam Rahega (Duet Asha Bhosle - Laxmikant-Pyarelal/Anand Bakshi) - Aadha Din Aadhee Raat 1977"										
 "Saathi Haath Badhana Dekh Akela Thak Jayega Milkar Bozz Uthana  (Team-Work Duet Asha Bhosle - O. P. Nayyar/Sahir Ludhianvi) - Naya Daur 1957"      [Aa Aa Aa Aa Aa ...] 										
 "Saathi Mere Saathi Rut Aati Jaati (Multi Mukesh and Lata Mangeshkar  - Laxmikant-Pyarelal/Anand Bakshi) - Aahutee II 1978"										
 "Saathi Na Koi Manzil Diya Hai Na Koi Mehfil Chala Mujhe Le Ke (Solo - S. D. Burman/Majrooh Sultanpuri) - Bambai Ka Babu 1960"      [Hun Hun Hun ...]										
 "Saathi O Saathi Hum Ne Tumko Kitni Khushi Se Dil De Diya Re Kaho Pyar Kiya Re Hum Ne Pyar Kiya Re (Duet Asha Bhosle - Gulshan Sufi/Kaif) - Ghamand 1955"										
 "Saathi Re Gham Nahin Karna (Duet Savita Suman - Bappi Lahiri/Kulwant Jani) - Ikraar 1979"										
 "Saathi Utha Badban Manzil Ko Ho Ja Ravaan (Solo - Chitragupt/Shyam Hindi) - Sindbad Jahazi or Sindbad The Sailor 1952"										
 "Saawan Ki Ghata Dheere Dheere Aana (Duet Khursheed - Sudhir Phadke/Amar Varma) - Aage Badho I  1947"										
 "Saaz E Dil Chhed De, Saaz E Dil Chhed De, Kya Haseen Raat Hain, Kuch Nahin Chahiye, Kuch Nahin Chahiye, Tu Agar Saath Hain, Saaz E Dil Chhed De (Duet Lata Mangeshkar - Kalyanji-Anandji/Farooq Qaiser) - Passport 1961"										
 "Saaz Ho Tum Awaz Hoon Main Tum Bina Ho Main Hoon Taar Rok Sako To Rok Lu Apni Payal Ki Jhankaar (Classical Solo - Naushad Ali/Khumar Barabankvi) - Saaz Aur Awaz 1966"										
 "Sab Din Hot Na Ek Samaan (Solo - Madan Mohan Kohli/Rajendra Krishan) - Senapati 1961"										
 "Sab Jawan Sab Haseen Koi Tum Sa Nahi (Solo - Lachhiram Tamar/Kaifi Azmi) - Main Suhagan Hoon 1964"										
 "Sab Ke Jeevan Prem (Bengali - Unknown) - Kazi Nazrul Islam's Songs 2004"										
 "Sab Ke Lab Par Naam Humara (Duet Asha Bhosle - Shyamji-Ghanshyamji/Majrooh Sultanpuri) - Harfan Maula 1976"										
 "Sab Ko Pyar Ki Pyas, Pyar Ki Pyas, Pyar Ki Pyas (Duet Lata Mangeshkar - Vasant Desai) - Pyar Ki Pyas 1960"      [Pyar Ki Pyas, Pyar Ki Pyas, Pyar Ki Pyas ..Aa Aa ..Kya Dharti Kya Aakash ...]										
 "Sab Kuch Chappar Phad Ke (Duet Chitalkar - C. Ramchandra/Pyare Lal Santoshi) -Sangeeta 1950"										
 "Sab Kuch Lutaya Hum Ne (Solo - Hansraj Behl/Mulkraj Bhakri) - Chunariya 1948"										
 "Sab Mein Shamil Ho Magar Sab Se Juda Lagti Ho, Sirf Hum Se Nahin Khud Se Bhi Khafa Lagti Ho (Solo - Ravi/Sahir Ludhianvi) - Bahu Beti 1965"										
 "Sab Sapne Poore Aaj Huye (Duet Geeta Roy - Chitragupt/Anjum Jaipuri) - Veer Babruwahan 1950"										
 "Sab Se Bada Hain Ji, Sabse Bada Hain Rupaiya (Duet Asha Bhosle - O. P. Nayyar/Pyare Lal Santoshi) - Sabse Bada Rupaiya 1955"   (Nashad Ali was also known as Shaukat Ali, Shaukat Haidari, Shaukat Dehlvi, Shaukat Husain and Shaukat Husain Haidari  also contributed music to this Album.)										
 "Sab Se Bada Rupaiya (Multi Chitalkar and Lata Mangeshkar - C. Ramchandra/Pyare Lal Santoshi) - Sargam 1950"										
 "Sab Se Jeevan Prem Adhar (Non-Filmy Solo - Unknown/Unknown) - Tere Bharose Nandlal 1991"										
 "Sab Se Mehangi Cheez Mohabbat (Solo - Hemant Kumar/Rajendra Krishan) - Anjaan 1956"										
 "Sab Se Pyara Sab Se Nyara (Duet Lata Mangeshkar - Roshan Lal/Prem Dhawan) - Taksaal 1956"										
 "Sabak Sabro Raza Ka De Gaye Hain (Solo - Allah Rakha Qureshi/Raja Mehdi Ali Khan) - Shaan-E-Haatim 1958"										
 "Sabar E Ayub (Solo - Unknown/Unknown) - Unknown ****"										
 "Sabhi Kuchh Luta Kar (Bengali album Hindi Solo - Nachiketa Ghosh/Gauri-Prasanna Mazumdar) - Shapmochan And Pathe Holo Deri And Indrani ****"										
 "Sach Kahoon Sach Kahoon Sach Kahoon Sach I Love you very Much, I Love You Very Much Aa Ha Ha Ha I Love You Very much (Patriotic Asha Bhosle - O. P. Nayyar) - Akalmand 1966"										
 "Sach Kehta Hoon Bahut Haseen Ho Tumse Mohabbat Ho Sakti Hai (Horse-Cart Duet Asha Bhosle - O. P. Nayyar/Raja Mehdi Ali Khan) - Jaali Note 1960"										
 "Sach Ki Hogi Jeet (Duet Asha Bhosle - R. Sudarsanam/HarGovind) - Matwala 1958" 										
 "Sachcha Hain Gar Pyar Mera (Solo - Shankar-Jaikishan/Shailendra) - Jhuk Gaya Aasmaan 1968"										
 "Sachchi Ho Lagan Jo Man Mein (Solo - Chitragupt) - Gayatri Mahima 1977"										
 "Sad Ke Heer Tujh Pe Hum Fakir Sad Ke (Solo Heer Raanza Scene - Shankar-Jaikishan/Prem Dhawan) - Mera Naam Joker 1970"  (Rafi Sings for Raj Kapoor) 									
 "Sada Itni Oomar Teri Rahe O Sanam Aa Aa Aa Na Satrah Se Upar Na Solah Se Kam Issi Oomar Mein Khaate Jaye Sitam O O O (16 th Birthday - Sonik-Omi) - Dharma 1973"										
 "Sada Rahein Din Yahin Humarein (Duet Lata Mangeshkar - Husnlal-Bhagatram/Mulkraj Bhakti) - Sawan Bhadon 1949"										
 "Sade Khetan Wich Rab Vasda (Punjabi Solo - Unknown/Prem Dhawan) - Bemisaal Vol. 2 and Bemisaal - Mohd. Rafi 2005"										
 "Sadiyon Purani Apni Kahani, Mohabbat Jise Aaj Dohra Rahin Hain, Humein Saath Dekha Hain Ik Baar Phir Se, Zamane Ke RakhTaar Sharma Rahin Hain (Duet Asha Bhosle - Ravi/Rajendra Krishan) - Shehnai 1964"      [O O O O O O ...]										
 "Sadka Utariyein Ki 2 (Solo - Naushad Ali/Shakeel Badayuni) - Palki 1967"       (See "Chehre Se Apne Aaj" for Part 1)  										
 "Sadke Heer Tujh Pe Hum Fakir Sadke Tujh Se Lut Kar (Solo - Shankar-Jaikishan) - Mera Naam Joker 1970"										
 "Sadke Teri Chaal Ke, Kajaraa Vajaraa Daal Ke, Jaaniwali Aana Kabhi Yaaonr Ki Gali, O Jadugar Bangal Ke Ashiq Naintaal Ke Ruste Mein Aaoon Tere Aise Hi Bhale (Duet Geeta Dutt - N. Dutta aka Datta Naik/Hasrat Jaipuri) - Mr. X 1957"      [Aa Ha Ha Ha ...]										
 "Sagar Nahin To Kya Hain (Solo - Laxmikant-Pyarelal/Anand Bakshi) - Naatak 1975"										
 "Sahil Jo Dubo De Kashti Ko, Sahil Jo Dubo De Kashti Ko, Sahil Ki Tammana Kaun Karein, Sahil Jo Dubo De Kashti Ko, Araam Na Ho Jis Manzil Par, Manzil Ki Tammana Kaun Karein, Sahil Jo Dubo De Kashti Ko (Solo - Krishna Dayal/Amar N Khanna) - Baawraa 1950" (Rafi Sings For Raj Kapoor)									
 "Sai Baba Bolo Sai Baba Bolo Dugmug Jag Yeh Dol Raha Hain (Prayer Multi Jani Babu Qawal, Anup Jalota and Anuradha Paudwal - Pandurang Dikshit/Manoj Kumar) - Shirdi Ke Saibaba 1977"      [Sai Baba Bolo Sai Baba Bolo ..Sai Raam Bolo Sai Shyam Bolo ..Allah Sai Bolo Maula Sai Bolo ..Nanak Sai Bolo Govind Sai Bolo ...] 										
 "Sainath Tere Hazaron Haath, Jis Jis Ne Tera Naam Liya, Tu Ho Liya Us Ke Saath (Duet Usha Mangeshkar - Pandurang Dixit) - Shirdi Ke Saibaba 1977 and Evergreen Mohd Rafi ****"      [Tu Hi Fakir, Tu Hi Hain Raaja, Tu Hi Hain Sai, Tu Hi Hain Baba Sainath, Sainath ...]										
 "Saiyan Chhod De Mera Haath (Duet Asha Bhosle - Shri Nath Tripathi/B. D. Mishra) - Dev Kanya 1963"										
 "Saiyan Dekh Dekh Dekh, Main Hoon Lakhon Mein Ek, Mera Dil Na Jalao Takraar Se, Meri Jaan Jaan Jaan, Maine Pakade Jee Kaan, Jo Bhi Bologi, Manoonga Pyar Se (Duet Suman Kalyanpur - Chitragupt) - Police Detective 1960"										
 "Saiyan Kyun Mujhe Aayi Angadai (Duet Asha Bhosle - O. P. Nayyar/Jan Nisar Akhtar) - Duniya Rang Rangeeli 1957"										
 "Saj Dhaj Ke (Solo - Iqbal Qureshi/Naseem Ajmeri) - Nek Parveen 1982"										
 "Saj Dhaj Ke Jab Chale Kaamini (Duet Shamshad Begum - Lala Asar Sattar/Asad Bhopali) - Shamsheer 1967"										
 "Saj Dhaj Ke Jab Tu Nikle (Solo - C. Arjun/Indeevar) - Mangu Dada 1970"										
 "Saj Rahi Gali Meri Amaa, Sunehri Gothe Mein (Munna Multi Mehmood and Eunuch - Rajesh Roshan/Majrooh Sultanpuri) - Kunwara Baap 1974"      [Are Aao Na Sunehari Gothe Mein, Roopehari Gothe Mein ...]										
 "Sajan Ki Ot Le Ke Haathon Mein Haath De Ke (Duet Lata Mangeshkar - Hansraj Behl/Habeeb Sarhadi) - Zevarat 1949"										
 "Sajan Sajan, Sajan Sajan Pukaroon Galiyon Mein, Kabhi Phoolon Mein Dhoondhoo, Kabhi Kaliyon Mein (Solo - Laxmikant-Pyarelal/Anand Bakshi) - Saajan 1969 and Mohammed Rafi Collection Vol. 4 ****"										
 "Sajan Tere Pyar Mein (Duet 99% Asha Bhosle - Sonik-Omi) - Mahua 1969"										
 "Sajaniya Kit Bhaae, Kar Ke Mera Dil Chori, Sajaniya Kit Bhage, Kar Ke Mera Dil Chori, ..Balamwa, Balamwa Dar Lage, Tu Chhora Main Chhori, Hoye Tu Chhora Main Chhori, ..Hoye  Sajaniyan Kit Bhaage, Kar Ke Mera Dil Chori, ..Balamwa, Balamwa Dar Lage, Tu Chhora Main Chhori, Hoye Tu Chhora Main Chhori (Duet Shamshad Begum - Husnlal-Bhagatram/Sarshar Sailani) - Birha Ki Raat 1950"										
 "Sajna Saath Nibhana Saathi Mere Saharon Ke Raah Mein Chhod Na Jana (Duet Asha Bhosle - Ravi/Rajendra Krishan) - Doli 1969"										
 "Sajna Sawan Aaya Haay (Duet Lata Mangeshkar - Chitragupt/Prem Dhawan) - Band Master 1963"										
 "Sakhi Sarkar Hain Teri Garibon Ka Tu Data (Qawali Duet Bande Hasan - Ghulam Mohammad) - Mirza Ghalib 1954"      [AA Aa Aa ..Kahan Jaaye Tere Mehfil Se Tere Matwale Aa Aa Aa ..Nigahe Pher Li Sab ne Lutega Aans Ke Dhere ..Aaaye Hain Kisi Umeed Jab Tu Hain Humara Dil Ka Gham ...]										
 "Salaam Aap Ki Meethi Nazar Ko Salam Kiya Hum Pe Jadu Asar Ko Salam (Solo - Shankar-Jaikishan/Hasrat Jaipuri) - Boy Friend 1961"										
 "Salaam Hain, Tum Ko Salam Hain, ..Kahinye Yeh Dastaan Kaisi Lagi ..Yeh Dastaan Nahin, Koi Payaam Hain (Qawali-Type Lata Mangeshkar - Laxmikant-Pyarelal/Anand Bakshi) - Aasha 1980"      [Ik Din Bahar Ne Phoolon Se Yeh Kaha, Kaaton Ki Nauk Par, Khilte Ho Tum Magar, Hanste Ho Jhoom Kar, Jakhmon Ko Choom Kar, Insanon ke Liye, Diwanon Ke Liye, Mushkil Yeh Kaam Hain, Tum Ko ...]										
 "Salaam Kijiye Aali Janab Aaye Hain Yeh Paanch Saalonka Dene Heesab Aaye Hain (Multi Qawali Bhupinder Singh and Amit Kumar - R. D. Burman/Gulzar) - Aandhi 1975"      [Aarti Ki Man-Maalti, Kehna Kyun Nahin Manti, Path-Shale Mein Chutti Ho Gayi, Barsa Kyun Nahin Manti, Barsa Kyun Nahin Manti, Barsa Kyun Nahin Manti  ..Aa Aa Aa ..Salam Kijiye, Aayi Hain Aarti Devi, Aa Aa Aa Yeh Thekedar Hain Bharat Ki Bharati Devi, ...]										
 "Salaam Lo (Duet Asha Bhosle - Rono Deb Mukherjee/Raja Mehdi Ali Khan) - Tuhi Meri Zindagi 1965"										
 "Salaam Sahibo, Main Aa Gaya, Main Aa Gaya [Laugh], Salaam Salaam Salaam Salaam Main Aa Gaya, Diya Kisi Se Mera Kaam Main Aa Gaya, Aaya Kahaan Se Jaoonga Kaise, Yeh Na Poochho Tum Dosto (Solo - Laxmikant-Pyarelal) - Teesri Aankh 1982"										
 "Salaam Salaam (Solo - Laxmikant-Pyarelal/Anand Bakshi) - Teesri Aankh 1982"										
 "Salamat Rahe Dostana Humara 1 (Duet Kishore Kumar - Laxmikant-Pyarelal/Anand Bakshi) - Dostana 1980"										
 "Salamat Rahe Dostana Humara 2 (Duet Kishore Kumar - Laxmikant-Pyarelal/Anand Bakshi) - Dostana 1980"										
 "Salamat Raho, Salamat Raho HAaye Salamat Raho (Classical Solo - Laxmikant-Pyarelal/Indeevar) - Parasmani 1963"      [Aa Aa Aa ..O O O ..Roshan Tumhin Se Duniya, Daulat Tumhin JahAan Ki, Phoolon Mein Palanewali, Rani Ho Gulsitan Ki, ..Salamat Raho, Salamat Raho, O O O Roshan Tumhin Se Duniya, Daulat Tumhin JahAan Ki, Phoolon Mein Palanewali, Rani Ho Gulsitan Ki, ...]										
 "Salle Allah Zulf Kaali Kaali (Solo - Chitragupt/Majrooh Sultanpuri) -Kabli Khan 1963"										
 "Samaaj Ko Badal Dalo (Solo - Ravi/Sahir Ludhianvi) - Samaaj Ko Badal Dalo 1970"										
 "Samajh Hain Moti Teri (Solo - R. D. Burman/Yogesh Gaud) - Mazaaq 1975"										
 "Samajho Zara Kehti Hain Kya, Meri Nazar Jaane Wafa, ..Aa Ha Ha Aa ..Jo Bhi Kaho Aise Kaho, Jaise Kabhi Kuch Na Kaha ..Aa Ha Ha Aa (Duet Asha Bhosle - Shankar-Jaikishan/Shamshul Huda Bihari) - Shatranj 1969"      [Tadap Jiski Hain Tumko, Main Usi Jannat Se Aaya Hoon, Mohabbat Ka Tumhare Waste Paigham Laya Hoon, ..Mohabbat Ke Farishte Se Meri Itni Gujarish Hain, Wanhan Ke Log Kaise Hain, Jahaan Chahat Ki Barish Hain, ..Wahaan Ka Zara Zara Apni Halat Par Salamat Hain, Tumhare Ek Na Hone Se, Wanhan Lekin Qayamat Hain ...]										
 "Samay Ka Chakkar (Solo - S. D. Burman) - Do Bhai 1947"										
 "Samay Ka Chakkar Sau Bal Khaye (Solo - Malik Sardar/Meeraji) - Raaz 1949"										
 "Samay Ka Khel Nirala (Prayer - Unknown) - Hari Ka Dhyan Laga Man Mere 2008"										
 "Sambhal Ae Dil (Duet Asha Bhosle - N. Dutta aka Datta Naik/Sahir Ludhianvi) - Sadhna 1958"										
 "Sambhal Aye Dil, Sambhal Aye Dil, Tadpne Aur Tadapaane Se Kya Hoga, Jahaan Badla Nahin Mumkeen, Wanha Jane Se Kya Hoga, Sambhal Aye Dil, Chale Aao, Chale Aao Ke Ab Munh Pher Ke, Jaane Se Kya Hoga, Jo Tum Par Bit Chuka, Us Dil Ko Tarsaane Se Kya Hoga (Duet Asha Bhosle - N. Dutta/Sahir Ludhianvi) - Sadhana 1958"      [Hun Hun Hun ...]										
 "Sambhal Kar Haseeno Se (Duet Asha Bhosle - Laxmikant-Pyarelal/Rajendra Krishan) - Yaari Dushmani 1980"										
 "Sambhal Kar Ishq Farmana Mohabbat Andhi Hoti Hain (Qawali Duet S. Bilbar - Ravi/Qamar Jalalabadi) - Pyar Ka Bandhan 1963"      [Maine Kaha ...]										
 "Sambhal Ke Baitho Zara Chaaw Main Baharon (Duet Suman Kalyanpur - Nashad Ali/Farooq Qaiser) - Rooplekha 1962"      (Nashad Ali was also known as Shaukat Ali, Shaukat Haidari, Shaukat Dehlvi, Shaukat Husain and Shaukat Husain Haidari.)										
 "Sambhal Ke Chalo Jaanam (Solo - Shankar-Jaikishan/Hasrat Jaipuri) - Vachan 1974"										
 "Sambhal Ke Jaiyyo Ho Banjare (Multi Geeta Roy and Lalita Deulkar - C. RamChandra/Rammurti Chaturvedi) - Saajan 1947"										
 "Sambhal Ke Sambhal Ke Sambhal Ke Yeh Duniya Hain Nagar Hoshiyaaron Ka, Idhar Aank Chapakayi aur Udhar maal Yaa Roka (Message Business Swing Solo - S. D. Burman/Majrooh Sultanpuri) - Sitaron Ke Aage 1958"      [O O O O O O ..Ae Ae Ae ..Gagari Sukhi Byail Piyaasa Kaale Megha Paani De Ae ..Akal Ka ...]										
 "Sambhal Sambhal Ke Jayiyo O Banjare O Banjare Dilli Door Hain (Patriotic Geeta Roy and Lilita Dewoolkar - C. RamChandra) - Sajan 1947"										
 "Samjha Main Kismat Khul Gayee (Solo - R. D. Burman/Majrooh Sultanpuri) - Daulat Ke Dushman 1983"										
 "Samjha Main Kismat Khul Gayee, Mujh Ko Ram Budhiya Mil Gayee (Solo 60th Birthday - R. D. Burman/Majrooh Sultanpuri) - Paanch Dushman 1973"										
 "Samne Aa Parda Hata, Hata Hata Aa Dekhe Zara Tujh Mein Aahe Aisa Hain Kya Kya Kya, Ja Re Ja Samajha Hain Kya Pyar Tujhe Karna Aata Hain Kya Kya Kya HAaye Kya (Qawali Duet Asha Bhosle - Dattaram Wadkar/Farooq Qaiser) - Ek Din Aadhi Raat 1971"      [Aa Aa Aa ...]										
 "Samne Aaj Donon Jahan Ke Aa (Duet Suman Hemadi Kalyanpur - Laxmikant-Pyarelal) - Do Bhai 1969"      [Aa Hum Ahd-E-Vafa Kar Dein Ye Rusm Ada Kar Lein ...]										
 "Samne Rakh Le Tujhe (Duet Suman Kalynpur - Chitragupt/Majrooh Sultanpuri) - Main Shadi Kar Ne Chala 1962"										
 "Samne Tu Hai Tujhe Dekh Ke Ab Kya Dekhoon (Solo - Chitragupt) - Pyar Ka Sapna 1969"      [Tere Chehre Se Hate Ankh To Duniya Dekhoon...] 										
 "San Ki Ho Khair Baba Sab Ka Bhala (Duet Chandbala - Khayyam/Sahir Ludhianvi) - Phir Subah Hogi 1958"										
 "San San San Woh Chali Hawa Chup Chup Kan Mein Kuch Kaha, Aa Ha Ha San San San Woh Chali Hawa Chup Chup Kan Mein Kuch Kaha, Naye Arman Jage Naye Toofan Jage Dhokhe Pe Dhokha Kha Hi Liya (Outdoor Multi Asha Bhosle and Sudha Malhotra - S. D. Burman/Kaifi Azmi) - Kaagaz Ke Phool 1959" [Laughing Ho O O O O O O O O ...[Whistle] Aa Ha Ha ] 										
 "Sanam Apni Palkon Pe Tujh Ko Bitha Kar Dikhata Hoon Duniya Ke Rangeen Nazare (Solo - Madan Mohan Kohli/Rajendra Krishan) - Pooja Ke Phool 1964"										
 "Sanam Tu Chal Diya Rasta (Solo - Salil Chowdhury/Majrooh Sultanpuri) - Maya 1961"										
 "Sanama, O Mere Pyar Ka Banayata Kahe Raita, Sanama, O Mere Pyar Ka Banayata Kahe Raita, O Jis Pe Chahata, O Main Us Pe Aaita, O Kyun Na Mujh Ko Gale Se Lagayata, Bubuli O Mera Kaiko Tu Kurta Banayata, O Jis Pe Jayata O Us Pe Aayata, O Tera Nakhara To Hum Ko Nahin Bhayata, Aaoon, Aaoon, Na Main Jaoon, Jaoon (Duet Hemlata - RajKamal) - Dost Aur Dushman 1971"										
 "Sanchi Ho Jo Lagan (Solo - Chitragupt/Anjaan) - Gayatri Mahimaa 1977"										
 "Sanchi Tumhuri Preet Ho Ram Jag Ka Pyar Hain Jhoota, Kar De Sita Ko Badnaam Yeh Sansaar Hain Jhoota (Prayer Solo - Roshan Lal/Anand Bakshi) - Bedaagh 1965"										
 "Sang Sang Beete (Bhojpuri Horse-cart Duet Manna Dey - ChitraGupt/Anjaan) - Nautanki 1980"										
 "Sang Sang Rahenge Tumhare Ji Huzoor Chanda Se Chakor Bhala Kaise Rahe Door 1 (Duet Asha Bhosle - Ravi/Shakeel Badayuni) - Mulzim 1963"										
 "Sang Sang Rahenge Tumhare Ji Huzoor Chanda Se Chakor Bhala Kaise Rahe Door 2 (Solo - Ravi/Shakeel Badayuni) - Mulzim 1963"										
 "Sangam Mein Naha Lo (Solo -  Jeetu-Tapan/Vishweshawar Sharma) - Sampoorna Sant Darshanam 1978"      [Sampoorna Sant Darshanum... ]										
 "Sanma O Mere Pyar Ka Baneyata Kay Rayata (Duet Hemlata - RajKamal) - Dost Aur Dushman 1971"										
 "Sannu Buk Naal Paani E Pi La De (Punjabi Solo - S. Mohinder/Inderjeet Singh Tulsi-Raj Kaur) - 50 Glorious Years Of Punjabi Film Music Vol. 1 **** and Ladlee 1979"										
 "Sansar Banane Wale Garibon Ko Bhi (Solo Prayer - Husnlal-Bhagatram/Qamar Jalalabadi) - Aansoo 1953" 										
 "Sanso Mein Kabhi (Duet Asha Bhosle - R. D. Burman/Majrooh Sultanpuri) - Parchhayian 1972 and Evergreen Mohd Rafi ***** "										
 "Sanso Mein Kabhi (Solo Extracted from Duet - R. D. Burman/Majrooh Sultanpuri) - Parchhayian 1972"										
 "Sanwar De Jo Pyar Se (Solo - G. S. Kohli/Anjaan) - The Adventures Of Robinhood 1965"										
 "Sanwariyan Bansiwala Nandlala Matawala Hain, Gokul Ka Ujiyala, Hain Gokul Ka Ujiyala, Sanwariyan Bansiwala Nandlala Matawala Hain, Gokul Ka Ujiyala, Hain Gokul Ka Ujiyala (Janmashthami Prayer Duet Ameer Bai - Shyam Babu Pathak/Bharat Vyas) - Janmashthami 1950"										
 "Sapna Dekha Raat Ke Jaise (Duet Suman Kalyanpur - Usha Khanna/Akhtar Romani) - Raat Andheri Thi 1967"										
 "Saqi (Qawali - Sajjad Husen) - Aakhri Sajda 1977"      [Lai Laah Illah Illah ..Nigahein ...]										
 "Saqi Ki Har Nigah Pe Balkhake Pee Gaya, Laheron Se Khelta Hua Lehrake Pee Gaya (Urdu Sharabi Ghazal Solo - Taj Ahmad Khan/Jigar Moradabadi) - Mohd Rafi Ghazals Vol. 2 **** and Mohd. Rafi - Unforgettable Ghazals Of Mohd. Rafi ****"      [O O O O O O  ...]										
 "Saqi Ki Nigahon Se Bach Kar ..Aji Hoga Kya Aage Janab Dekhna (Qawali Vani Jayaram - O. P. Nayyar) - Khoon Ka Badla Khoon 1978"										
 "Saqi-a Aesi Pila De, Hum Ko Deewana Bana De, Hum Nashe Mein Choor Ho Kar, Apne Sare Gham Bhoola, Hum Nashe Mein Choor Ho Kar, Apne Sare Gham Bhoola, Saqia Aesi Pila De (Hick-up) (Sharabi - Sudarshan) - Mall Road 1961"      [Jaam Chalne Ko Hain, Sab Ahele Nazar Baithe Hain, Aankhen Choorana Na Saqi, Hum Bhi Idhar Baithe Hain, ...]										
 "Sar Jo Tera Chakraye Ya Dil Dooba Jaye Aa Ja Pyare Paas Humare Kahe Khabray Kahe Khabray (Business Solo - S. D. Burman/Sahir Ludhianvi) - Pyaasa 1957 and Mohammed Rafi Collection Vol. 4 ****"     [Malish Tel Malish ...]										
 "Sar Ko Hatheli Par Liye Jo Saamne Aaya Nahi Kya Khaak Jiyegaa Jise (Solo - Neenu Mujumdar/Bharat Vyas) - Raja Ratan 1953"										
 "Sar Par Lamba Top Le Kar Aayega, Chont Jaisi Naak Pe Kho Jayega, Tera Dulha ..Haan Dulha Dulha, Hogi Thu Thu Sare Gao Mein, Gao Mein, ..Bhais Jaisi Tond Le Ke Aayegi, Tak Tak Bhaingiyon Ko Dekh Sharmayegi Teri Dulhan, Dulhan Dulhan, Baitha Royega Pad Ke Chhao Mein, Chhao Mein (Duet Asha Bhosle - Laxmikant-Pyarelal/Sahir Ludhianvi) - Izzat 1968"										
 "Sar Par Topi Lal Haath Mein Resham Ka Rumal Ho Tera Kya Kahena, Sar Par Topi Lal Haath Mein Resham Ka Rumal Ho Tera Kya Kahena, Oye Gore Gore Gaal Gaal Pe Uljhe Uljhe Baal Ho Tera Kya Kahena, Gore Gore Gaal Gaal Pe Uljhe Uljhe Baal Ho Tera Kya Kahena (Duet Asha Bhosle - O. P. Nayyar/Marrooh Sultanpuri) - Tumsa Nahin Dekha 1957"										
 "Sara Jahan Chhod Ke Tujhe, Maine Sallm Kiya Hain, Tune Bhi Kya Aisa Koi, Kaam Kiya Hain, ..Maine To Khud Apna, Jeena Haraam Kiya Hain, Jis Din Se Haath Tera Thaam Liya Hain, Sara Jahaan..  (Duet Usha Mangeshkar - Bappi Lahiri/Ramesh Pant) - Wardat 1981 and Evergreen Mohd Rafi ****"										
 "Sara Mora Kajra (Duet Aarti Mukherji - Hemant Kumar/Kaifi Azmi) - Do Dil 1965"										
 "Saranga Teri Yaad Mein 1 (Solo - Sardar Malik/Bharat Vyas) - Saranga 1960"										
 "Sardara Ve Mera Dil Dharka (Duet Suman Hemadi Kalyanpur - Sapan-Jagmohan) - Maa Ki Saugandh 1980"										
 "Sare Mehfil Jo Jala Parwana (Duet Suraiya - Husnlal-Bhagatram/Majrooh Sultanpuri) - Shama Parwana 1954"										
 "Sare Shaher Mein Aap Sa Koi Nahin (Duet Asha Bhosle - Kalyanji-Anandji) - Bairaag 1976"										
 "Sare Shehar Mein Aap Sa Koi Nahin (Duet Asha Bhosle - Laxmikant-Pyarelal) - Suhaag 1979"										
 "Sare Umran De Pai Gai Vichode, Saath Chhod Chali (Punjabi Shamshad Begum - Hansraj Behl) - Do Lachhian 1959"										
 "Sare Zamane Pe Mausam Suhane Pe Iss Dil Deewane Pe Wirani Si Chhayi Thi Aap Aaye Bahar Aayee (Solo - Laxmikant-Pyarelal/Anand Bakshi) - Aap Aaye Bahar Aayee 1971"										
 "Sarfarosh Ki Tamanna (Patriotic Multi Manna Dey and Rajendra Mehta - Prem Dhawan/Prem Dhawan) - Shaheed 1965 and Shahenshah 1988"										
 "Sarfaroshi Ki Tamanna Ab Humarein Dil Mein Hain (Patriotic Solo - Lachhiram Tamar/Ram Prasad Bismil) - Shaheed-E-Azam Bhagat Singh 1954"										
 "Sarfroshi Ki Tamanna Ab Humarein Dil Mein Hain (Patriotic Solo - Husnlal-Bhagatram/Qamar Jalalabadi) - Shaheed Bhagat Singh 1963"										
 "Sari Khushiyan Hain Mohabbat Ki Zamane Ke Liye Maine To Pyar Kiya Tha Aansoo Bahane Ke Liye (Solo - Laxmikant-Pyarelal/Anand Bakshi) - Suhana Safar 1970"										
 "Sarkar Aayiye, Tashreef Layiye (Classical Asha Bhosle and Jaspal Singh - Rajesh Roshan) - Gul-E-Bakkavali 1982 (Prince Tajmulik-Fairy Bakawali, A Medieval Romance)"										
 "Satgur Nanak Ji Tan Tan Ho Bhakshanhar (Punjabi Solo Prayer - Surinder Kohli/Chaman Lal Shugal) - Shabad Devotional Songs **** and Shabad and Devotional Songs of Mohd. Rafi 2004"      [Ik ..Rab Dharti Pe Aaya Balak Ban Ke Nanak Naam Rakha ...]										
 "Sathiya Nahi Jana Ke Jee Na Lage, Mausam Hain Suhana Ke Jee Na Lage, Sathiya Maine Mana Ke Jee Na Lage, Jee Ko Tha Samajhana Ke Jee Na Lage (Duet Lata Mangeshkar - Laxmikant-Pyarelal/Anand Bakshi) - Aya Sawan Jhoom Ke 1969"      [Sathiya, Sathiya ...] 										
 "Sathiya Tu Mere Sapnon Ka Meet Hain (Duet Asha Bhosle - Laxmikant-Pyarelal/Anand Bakshi) - Insaan 1982"										
 "Sathiyo Sun Lo Zara (Solo - Nitin Mangesh/Qamar Jalalabadi) - Samaantaa 1972"										
 "Sau Baar Bana Kar Maalik Ne (Solo - Usha Khanna/Yogesh Gaud) - Ek Raat 1967"										
 "Sau Baar Janam Lenge Sau Baar Fanah Honge Aye Jaane Wafa Phir Bhi Hum Tum Na Juda Honge (Solo - Ravi/Asad Bhopali) - Ustadon Ke Ustad 1963 and Mohammed Rafi Collection Vol. 2 ****"      [Wafa Ke Deep Jalaye Huye Nigahon Mein, Bhatak Rahin Ho Bhala Kyun Udas Raho Mein, Tumhein Khayal Hain Tum Mujh Se Door Ro Baithe Main Samane Hoon Chali Aao Meri Bahon Mein ...]										
 "Sau Baras Ki Zindagi Se Achhe Hain Pyar Ke Do Char Din (Birthday Asha Bhosle - Shankar-Jaikishan/Rajendra Krishan) - Sachaai 1969"										
 "Sau Do Sau Ki Naukri Kahan Se Laoon Car Le Aata Shahi Badhti To Main Hota RajKumar O Gori Cycle Pe Ho Ke Sawar Nikal Gale Sune Mein, Na Choon Shahi Badhti Na Chhoon Motor Car De De Apni Naukeri O Mere RajKumar O Phir Cycle Pe Ho Ke Sawar Nikal Gale Sune Mein (Cycle Duet Lata Mangeshkar - Ravindra Jain/Ravindra Jain) - Hum Nahin Sudhrenge 1980"										
 "Sau Ka Note Hain Sau Ka Note Babu (Solo - S. Mohinder/Anjaan) - Sau Ka Note 1955"										
 "Sau Saal Pehle Mujhe Tum Se Pyar Tha, Mujhe Tum Se Pyar Tha, Aaj Bhi Hain Aur Kal Bhi Rahega, ..Sadiyon Se Tujh Se Milne, Jiya Beqaraar Tha, Jiya Beqaraar Tha, Aaj Bhi Hain, Aur Kal Bhi Rahega, ..Sau Saal Pehle Mujhe Tum Se Pyar Tha, Mujhe Tum Se Pyar Tha, Aaj Bhi Hain Aur Kal Bhi Rahega (Duet Lata Mangeshkar - Shankar-Jaikishan/Hasrat Jaipuri) - Jab Pyar Kisi Se Hota Hai 1961"										
 "Sau Sau Ka Note Pe Na Ja (Duet Krishna Kalle - Chitragupt/Prem Dhawan) - Bank Robbery 1969"										
 "Sava Lakh Ki Lottery (Duet Lata Mangeshkar - Shankar-Jaikishan/Shailendra) - Chori Chori 1956"										
 "Savere Wali Gaadi Se Chale Jaayenge Kuch Le Ke Jayenge Kuch De Ke Jayenge (Solo - Shankar-Jaikishan/Shailendra) - Laat Saab or Saheb 1967 and Mohammed Rafi Collection Vol. 4 ****"										
 "Sawan Aaye Ya Na Aaye Jiya Jab Jhoomein Sawan Hain (Classical Duet Asha Bhosle - Naushad Ali/Shakeel Badayuni) - Dil Diya Dard Liya 1966"										
 "Sawan Ke Mahine Mein Ek Aaag Si Sine Mein Lagti Hain To Pee Leta Hoon Do Char Ghadi Ji Leta Hoon 1 (Outdoor Solo - Madan Mohan Kohli/Rajendra Krishan) - Sharabi 1964"      [Chaad Ki Chaal Bhi Hain Behki Huyi…..]    										
 "Sawan Ke Mahine Mein Ek Aaag Si Sine Mein Lagti Hain To Pee Leta Hoon Do Char Ghadi Ji Leta Hoon 2 (Solo - Madan Mohan Kohli/Rajendra Krishan) - Sharabi 1964"        [Sochta Hoon Ki Piyun Na Piyun ...] 										
 "Sawan Ke Mahine Mein Ek Aaag Si Sine Mein Lagti Hain To Pee Leta Hoon Do Char Ghadi Ji Leta Hoon 3 (Outdoor Solo - Madan Mohan Kohli/Rajendra Krishan) - Sharabi 1964"      [Lu La La La Lu La La La ...]    										
 "Sawan Ki Pari Choop Choop Hain Khudi Bheegi Zulfein Khooli Hain Shokh Nazarein Zooki Hain Inn Adaon Pe Batao Pyar Aaye Ke Na Aaye (Duet Asha Bhosle - C. Arjun) - Murder On Highway 1970"										
 "Sawan Mein Megh Ude (Duet Suman Kalyanpur - Chitragupt/Gopal Singh Nepali) - Shri Krishna Bhakti 1955"										
 "Seedhe Raaste Chaloge To (Duet Kishore Kumar - R. D. Burman/Verma Malik) - Heeralal Pannalal 1978"										
 "Seedhe Saadhe Insaanon Ka (Solo - Ravi/Asad Bhopali) - Tu Nahin Aur Sahin 1960"										
 "Seva Apna Dharam Hain (Duet Lakshmi Rai - Chitragupt/Ramesh Chandra Pandey) - Bhakth Puraan 1952"										
 "Shaadi ke Liye Razamand Kar Li (Solo - Laxmikant-Pyarelal/Anand Bakshi) - Devi 1970"										
 "Shaam Dekho Dhal Rahin Hain, Shaam Dekho Dhal Rahin Hain, Panchhi Dekho Ja Rahe Hain, Tu Bhi Chal Mere Sang, Hoye Jeevan Saathi, Shaam Dekho Dhal Rahin Hain, Panchhi Dekho Ja Rahe Hain, Tu Bhi Chal Mere Sang Ho Jeevan Saathi, Shaam Dekho Dhal Rahin Hain (Duet Usha Khanna - Usha Khanna/Manohar Khanna) - Anjaan Hai Koi 1969"										
 "Shaam Suhani Ho, Nadi Ho, Paani Ho (Solo - Sardul Kwatra/Verma Malik) - Kala Chor 1956"										
 "Shaam-E-Bahar Aayi, Kar Ke Singar Aayi, Khwabon Ke Haar Layi Aa Aa Aa Aa Aa Aa, Abre Bahar Chhaya, Paigam-E-Yaar Laya, Dil Ko Qaraar Aaya Aa Aa Aa Aa Aa Aa,      Shaam-E-Bahar Aayi, Kar Ke Singar Aayi, Khwabon Ke Haar Layi Aa Aa Aa Aa Aa Aa (Duet Suraiya - Husnlal Bagatram/Majrooh Sultanpuri) - Shama Parwana 1954"										
 "Shaam-E-Baharan Subhe Chaman Tu Mere Swabaabon Ko Pyaaree Dulhan Tujh Se Nazar Meri Takaraa Gayee (Solo - Usha Khanna/M. K. Javed) - Aa Jaa Sanam 1975"										
 "Shadi Ke Liye Razaamand Kar Li, Razaamand Kar Li, Maine Ik Ladki Pasand Kar Li, Shadi Ke Liye Razaamand Kar Li, Razaamand Kar Li, Maine Ik Ladki Pasand Kar Li, Ho Udti Chidiyaan Pinjare Mein Band Kar Li, Udti Chidiyaan Pinjare Mein Band Kar Li, Maine Ik Ladki Pasand Kar Li, Aa Ha, Shadi Ke Liye Razaamand Kar Li, Razaamand Kar Li, Maine Ik Ladki Pasand Kar Li (Solo - Laxmikant-Pyarelal/) - Devi 1970"  										
 "Shadi To Huyi Kahani Iss Dorangi Duniya Mein Kahi Tu Dhokha Khaaye Na (Duet Asha Bhosle - Chitragupt) - Raaj Kanyaa 1955"										
 "Shaheedon Amar Hain Tumhari Kahaani (Patriotic Solo - Datta Devjekar and Jagannath/Anjaan) - Golconda Ka Qaidi 1954"										
 "Shaheedon Tum Ko Mera Salaam (Patriotic Solo - Shyam Sundar/Qamar Jalalabadi) - Bazaar 1949"										
 "Shaher Mein Charcha Hain (Duet Lata Mangeshkar - Laxmikant Pyarelal/Anand Bakshi) -Aas Paas 1980"										
 "Shama Jalti Hain To Parwane Chale Aate Hain, Shama Jalti Hain To, Sad Ke Par Ishq Ke Diwane Chale Aate Hain, Shama Jalti Hain To Parwane Chale Aate Hain, Shama Jalti Hain To (Duet Geeta Roy - Krishna Dayal/Gafil Harnalvi) - Baawra 1950" (Rafi Sings for Raj Kapoor)										
 "Shamma Bujh Ne Ko Chali (Solo - Chitragupt/Majrooh Sultanpuri) - Ganga Ki Lehrein 1964"      [O O O O O O ...]										
 "Shamma Jali Parwana Aaya (Duet Lata Mangeshkar - Ghulam Mohammed/Shakeel Badayuni) - Amber 1952" (Rafi sings for Raj Kapoor)										
 "Shamma Mein Taqat Kahan Jo, Ek Parwane Mein Hain, Ek Parwane Mein Hain, Luft Jalane Mein Nahin, Jal Jal Ke Mar JAane Mein Hain, Jal Jal Ke Mar JAane Mein Hain (Solo - Madan Mohan Kohli/Hasrat Jaipuri) - Naya Kanoon 1965"      [Aa Aa Aa ...]										
 "Shankar Bhole Bhaale (Duet Asha Bhosle - Ramlal Heerapanna/Bharat Vyas) - Naag Lok 1957"										
 "Sharab Hain (Solo - Ravindra Jain/Ravindra Jain) - Aatish I 1979"										
 "Sharab Ka Sahara Le Ke (Solo - Roshan Lal/Anand Bakshi) - Commercial Pilot Officer 1963"										
 "Sharabi Kehta Hain Mujh Ko Zamana Hai Bada Pagala (Multi Nitin Mukesh and Lata Mangeshkar - Shankar-Jaikishan/Verma Malikj) - Do Jhoot 1975"      [Na Mujh Ko Hichaki Aayi Na Pao Mora Fisalaa Are Are Are ...] 										
 "Sharma Ke Na Ja Tadpa Ke Na Ja Nagin Ki Tarah Bulaukhate Na Ja Jaane Man Ja Na Ne Man (Solo - Ravi/Rajendra Krishan) - Shehnai 1964"										
 "Sharma Ke Yun Na Dekh Ada Ke Makaam Se Ab Baat Badh Chuki Hain Khaya Ke Makaam Se (Classical Solo - Ravi/Sahir Ludhianvi) - Neelkamal 1968"										
 "Shatranj Ki Chaal Hamari, Shatranj, Shatranj, Shatranj Ki Chaal Hamari, ShatRanj Ki Chaal Hamari, Tu Ranj Na Karna Pyari, Tujhe Jeet Ke Le Jayenge, Dekhengi Duniya Sari (Solo - Shankar-Jaikishan/Indeevar) - Shatranj 1969"										
 "Shauq Har Rang Raeeb-E-Sar-O-Saman Nikla (Urdu Ghazal Solo - Unknown/Mirza Ghalib) - Mohd Rafi Ghazals Vol. 2 **** and This Is Mohd Rafi Saab -Ghazala And Bhajans ****Mohd. Rafi - Unforgettable Ghazals of Mohd. Rafi ****"										
 "Shayar To Nahin Hoon Lekin (Solo - Sapan-Jagmohan/Naqsh Lyallpuri) - Insaaf Ka Mandir 1969"										
 "She Ne Khela He Se Aaj Cricket Match Ek Nazar Mein Dil Bechaara Ho Gaya LBW (Cricket Solo - Shankar-Jaikishan/Hasrat Jaipuri) - Love Marriage 1959"										
 "Sheeshe Ka Ho, Ya Patthar Ka Dil, Mohabbat Karo, Dhadkane Lage, Ek Bin Jale Shamma Hain Yeh Dil, Jo Shola Mile Bhadkane Lage  (Duet Lata Mangeshkar - S. D. Burman/Majrooh Sultanpuri) - Baat Ek Raat Ki 1962"      [Yeh Dil-Kashi Na Hogi, Mehtaab Ki Kiran Mein, Patthar Ka Dil Na Hota, Haaye Patthar Ka Dil Na Hota, Aey Kash Iss Badan Mein ...]										
 "Sher Ka Husn Ho (Solo - Khayyam/Sahir Ludhianvi) - Chambal Ki Kasam 1979"										
 "Sher Se Lad Ne Aayee Dekho, Shehar Ki Ik Billi, Chidiya Ghar Mein, Bhej De Is Ko, Culcutte Ya Dilli, Dilli Thik Rahegi (Swing Solo  - Shankar-Jaikishan/Rajendra Krishan) - Preetam 1971"										
 "Shikar Kar Ne Ko Aaye Shikar Ho Ke Chale (Solo - Shankar-Jaikishan/Hasrat Jaipuri) - Shikar 1968"      [Tumhare Pyar Mein Hum Beqaraar Ho Ke Chale ...]										
 "Shirdi Wale Sai Baba Aaya Hain Tere Dar Pe (Qawali Solo Prayer - Laxmikant-Pyarelal/Anand Bakshi) - Amar Akbar Anthony 1977 and Evergreen Mohd Rafi ****"      [Zamane Mein Kahaan Tooti Hui Tasveer Banti Hai ...]										
 "Shodhisi Manava Rahooli Mandiri (Marathi Solo - Shrikant Thakre/Vandana Vitankar) - Amrutachi Godi **** and Nisarga Raja Vol-3 ****"										
 "Shokh Ankhen Dekh Kar Surat Se Pyar Aa Hi Gaya (Duet Asha Bhosle - Shankar-Jaikishan/Hasrat Jaipuri) - Kahin Aur Chal 1968"      [Shokh Ankhen Shokh Ankhen ... ]										
 "Shokhiyan Nazar Mein Hain (Solo - Laxmikant Pyarela/Anad Bakshil) - Aasra II 1966"										
 "Shokiyan Nazar Mein Hain, Mustiyan Hain Chaal Mein, Jab Se Hain Mere Khayal Mein, Koi Baat Koi Yaad Koi Naam (Solo - Laxmikant-Pyarelal/Anand Bakshi) - Vaada Tera Vaada 1974"										
 "Shola Ulfat Ka Bhadaka Ke, Mere Dil Mein Aag Laga Ke, Na Tarasaiye, Hum To Kab Se Huye Tumhare, Chup Ke Laaj Sharam Ke Mare, Yeh Faramaiye (Duet Asha Bhosle - Ravi/Shakeel Badayuni) - Aurat II 1967" 										
 "Sholay Sholay (Duet Lata Mangeshkar - Bappi Lahiri/Gauhar Kanpuri) - Locket 1986"										
 "Shri Krishna Govind Gopalam (Solo - Vedpal/Madhukar Rajasthani) - Sant Tukaram 1965"										
 "Shubh Din Aaye Ho (Duet Asha Bhosle - Jamal Sen/Shamshul Huda Bihari) - Rangeela 1953"										
 "Shukriya Aap Ki Inayat Ka (Duet Asha Bhosle - Lala Asar Sattar/Farooq Qaiser) - Chalbaaz 1969"										
 "Shyam Abhimani, O Shaym Abhimani, Shyam Abhimaani, O Shaym Abhimaani, Tum To Bhaye, Mathura Ke Raja, Roti Rahi RadhaRani, O Deewani Bhali Hi Deewani,  O Deewani Bhali Hi Deewani, O Deewani Bhali Hi Deewani,  O Deewani Bhali Hi Deewani, Raja Hua Main Logon Ka Lekin, Radha Mere Man Ki Rani (Duet Janmashthami Dandiya Asha Bhosle - Ravindra Jain/Ravindra Jain) - Geet Gata Chal 1975"										
 "Shyam Ki Yaad Mein (Duet Madhbala Zaveri - Husnlal-Bhagatram/Pandit Radheshyam) - Krishna Sudhama 1957"										
 "Shyam Se Neha Lagaaye, Radhe Neer Bahaaye (Solo Janmashthami Bhajan - Mohammed Zahur "Khayyam" Hashmi Cum Sharmaji) - Tere Bharose Nandlal 1991 and This Is Mohd Rafi Saab -Ghazala And Bhajans ****"										
 "Sidhe Raaste Chaloge To Aisa Zamana Milega (Duet Kishore Kumar - R. D. Burman) - Heeralal Pannalal 1978"										
 "Simti Hui Yeh Ghadiyan (Duet Lata Mangeshkar - Khayyam/Sahir Ludhianvi) - Chambal Ki Kasam 1979"										
 "Sindhu Ki HunKaar Le (Duet Asha Bhosle - Chitragupt/Bharat Vyas) - Navratri 1955"										
 "Sipayi Sipayi (Telugu Duet P. Susheela - C. RamChandran/Dr. C. Narayana Reddy) - Akbar Saleem Anarkali **** and Dr. C Narayana Reddy - Golden Memoirs"										
 "Sirf Tum Hi To Ho Jis Pe Marte Hain Hum Yeh Raaz Aaj Tum Ko Batate Hai Hum (Duet Asha Bhosle - Shankar-Jaikishan/Hasrat Jaipuri) - Budtameez 1966"										
 "Sita Ke Liye Shiksha Hai Yahin (Solo - Laxmikant-Pyarelal) - Jeeyo Aur Jeene Do 1982"      [Chup Chup Apni JAan Pe Sahe Ja Duniya Ka Itiyar ...]										
 "Sitam Bhi Tumharein (Duet Asha Bhosle - Malay Chakraborty/Arzoo Lakhnavi) - Mukti 1960"
 "Sitamgar Aag Tere Dil Mein (Solo - Naushad/Shakeel Badayuni) - Aan I 1952"										
 "So Ja Baba Mere (Lori Munna Solo - Madan Mohan Kohli/Gulzar) - Koshish 1972"										
 "So Ja Sanam (Solo - Sapan-Jagmohan/Naqsh Lyallpuri) - Rocky Mera Naam 1973"										
 "So Na Re Bhaiya So Na Re (Solo - S. M. Subbaiah Naidu/Saraswati Kumar Deepak) - Hamein Bhi Jeene Do 1962"										
 "Soch Naa Manva Teri Taqdeer Bananewala (Solo - Shankar-Jaikishan/Shailendra) - Pooja 1954"										
 "Soch Ne Ko Lakh Baatein Soche Insan (Solo - Madan Mohan Kohli/Rajendra Krishan) - Baap Bete 1959"										
 "Socho Ji Socho Ji Zamaana Kya Kehta Hain Kahene Do Ji (Duet Asha Bhosle - Iqbal Qureshi/Aziz Kaisi) - Zamana Badal Gaya 1961"										
 "Sochta Hoon Ke Tumhe Maine Kahin Dekha Hai (Duet Krishna Kalle - Kalyanji-Anandji/Akhtar Romani) - Raaz 1967"      [Kya Soch Rahe Ho Tum Nahin Kuch Nahin Hun Hu Kuch Nahin ...]										
 "Sohneo Makhno (Punjabi Horse-cart Duet with Dialogue Narinder Biba - Unknown/Inderjeet Hasanpuri) - Duets Of Narinder Biba **** and Daaj and Teri Meri Ek Jindri ****"										
 "Sohniye (Goriye) Nee Heeriye Ni (Punjabi Duet Zeenat Begum - Shyam Dundar/Unknown) - Gul Baloch 1942"     (Recorded on February 28, 1941 in Lahore ads first Punjabi film song and became so popular that it was heard in every lane.  Seeing the efficacy of Rafi as for singing, famous actor Nazir and producer – actor K Asif invited Rafi to Mumbai  for singing in films.  Mr. Ashraf Khan indicates that he was instrumental in introducing Rafi to Film Industry.)  										
 "Sola Singar Karke Jo Aayi Suhaag Raat Aai Suhaag Raat, Aayi Suhag Raat, Jalwe Tumhare Husn Ke Lai Suhaag Raat, Lai Suhaag Raat (Solo - Shankar-Jaikishan/Hasrat Jaipuri) - Gaban 1966"										
 "Solah Baras Ki Bhai Umariya (16th Birthday Duet Shamshad Begum - Ram Ganguly/Behzad Lakhnavi) - Aag I 1948"      [O O O O O O ...]										
 "Sona Re Tujhe Kaise Milun Dobaari Tujhe Kaise Milun (Duet Sulakshana Pandit - J. P. Kaushik/Padma SachDev)- Aankhin Dekhi 1978"  [Aa Aa Aa ..O O O ...]  										
 "Sone Deti Hain Na Ye Raat Koi Baat Karo, Ho Suhaagan Yeh Mulaaqat Koi Baat Karo (Classical Solo - Shankar-Jaikishan/Neeraj) - Patangaa 1971"      [Aa Aa Aa ...]										
 "Sone Jaise Pyar Ko (Solo - G. S. Kohli/Anjaan) - Lambe Haath 1960"										
 "Sone Jaise Pyar Ko Samajh Liya Taamba Oye Sone Jaise Pyar Ko Samajh Liya Tamba (Solo Marathi/Hindi - G. S. Kohli) - Lambe Haath 1960"      [O O O O O O ..Aa Aa Aa ..Are Kahaan Chale, Kai Jhaal, O Kahaan Chale, Kai Jhaal, Zara Thaamba, Zara Thaamba, Oye  ...]										
 "Sone Ke Gehne Kyun Too Ne Pahane Teree Khud Kanchan Hey (Duet Unknown Female - Shankar-Jaikishan/Indeevar) - Resham Ki Dori 1974"										
 "Sone Ke Tere Jhumke (Duet Usha Khanna - Laxmikant-Pyarelal/Anand Bakshi) - Daku Mangal Singh 1966"										
 "Soniye Jo Main Tujh Ko (Duet Meenu Pureshottam - Surender Kohli/Mahendra Dehlvi) - Qasam 1976"										
 "Soniye Tera Chahe Jo Bhi Naam, Hum Tumhein Kahenge, Magar Subah-O-Sham, Sweetheart, Sweetheart (Solo - Kalynji Anandji) - Sweetheart 1971 (Unreleased Shashi Kapoor & Asha Parekh Film)" 										
 "Soniyon Makhno Malai Ke Donio (Punjabi Duet Minoo Purushottam - S. Mohinder) - Daaj 1977"      [Hurra Hat Moto ..O Ho Ha ...]										
 "Sonwa Ke Pinjra Mein (Bhojpuri Solo - Chitragupt/Shailendra) - Ganga Maiya Tohe Piyari Chadhaibo (bjp) 1962"										
 "Soona Soona Laage (Solo - Chitragupt/Bharat Vyas) - Neel Mani 1957"										
 "Sooni Sooni Lag Rahi Hain Chandni (Duet Asha Bhosle - Lala Asar Akhtar/Farooq Qaiser) - Chalbaaz 1969"										
 "Soorat Ho to Aisi Ho, Dekh Jise Chanda Sharmayein, Surat Ho To Aisi Ho, ..Ang Ang Mein Bijli Lehraye Surat Ho To Aisi Ho (Qawali Multi Chitalkar, Talat Mahmood and Francis Waz - C. Ramchandra/Rajendra Krishan) - Barish 1956"      [Aa Aa Aa ..Zulf Hain Dosh Te, Ya Saap Hain Balkhaya Hua, Chaal Jaise Mod Koi, Rakht Mein Aaya Hua, Yeh Dil Ke Dushman Hai Yeh, Aankhon Ke Gulabi Dore, Bachke Jayega Koi Chot Koi Khaya Hua ..Ek Nazar Mein Dil Le Jaye, Ek Dil Mein Dil Jaye ...]										
 "Sorry Sorry Very Sorry Aap Ki Kasam (Duet Asha Bhosle - C. Arjun/Naqsh Lyallpuri) - Road No. 303 1960"										
 "Soun Mahina Aaya (Punjabi Duet Usha Mangeshkar - Surender Kohli/Mahendra Dehlvi) - 50 Glorious Years Of Punjabi Films Vol. 5 **** and Jindari Yaar Di 1978"
 "Soyi Humare Sapnon Ki Duniya (Duet Geeta Roy - Avinash Vyas/Bharat Vyas) - Aadhi Roti  1957"										
 "Sree Ram Jai Ram (Solo - Kamalkant/Uday Khanna) - Mahabali Hanuman 1980"										
 "Sree Ramchandra Ashrit Parijatah, Samasra Kalyanam Guna Viranamah, Sita Mukham Gurah Chanchrikah, Neeran Karam Mangalah Mataram, Aa Aa Aa ...Jai Raghunandan Jai Siyaram Jai Raghunandan Jai Siyaram Dekh Tu Bhanjan Tumhe Pranam (Prayer Asha Bhosle - Ravi) - Gharana 1961"										
 "Stamgar Se Leta Hain Tu Intaqam (Solo - Sharmaji aka Khayyam/Swami Ramanand Saraswati) - Parda 1949"										
 "Subah Chale Shaam Chale (Duet Manna Dey - Iqbal Qureshi/Jan Nisar Akhtar) - Dastan-E-Laila Majnu 1974"      [Aa Aa Aa ..Laut Ke Aa Laut Ke Aa Chhod Na Jaa Veeraane Mein ...]										
 "Subah Na Aayi Sham Na Aayi ..Jis Din Teri Yaad Na Aayi (Solo - Iqbal Qureshi/Neeraj) - Cha Cha Cha 1964"      [Khush-i Jis Ne Khoji Woh Dhan Le Ke Lauta Hasi Jis Ne Khoji Chaman Le Ke Lauta Magar Pyar Ko Khojane Jo Chala Woh Na Tan Le Ke Lauta Na Man Le Ke Lauta ...]										
 "Subah Uth Ke Mirze Yaar Ne, Sahibaan Ka Le Liya Naam (Duet Shamshad Begum - Sardul Kwatra/Verma Malik) - Mirza Sahiban 1957"										
 "Subhan Allah Haseen Chehra Yeh Mustana Aadayein Khuda Mehbud Rakhen Har Bala Se Har Bala Se (Qawali - O. P. Nayyar/Shamshul Huda Bihari) - Kashmir Ki Kali 1964"      [Subhan Allah Haaye Haseen Chehra Haaye ...] 										
 "Sudh Bisar Gayi Aaj (Classical Prayer Manna Dey - Shri Nath Tripathi/Shailendra) - Sangeet Samrat Tansen 1962"										
 "Sudhama Mandir Dekh Darein (Solo - Husnlal-Bhagatram/Pandit Radheshyam) - Krishna Sudhama 1957"										
 "Suhag Reek Atauri Chetna Ko (Duet Pankaj Mitra - Salil Chowdhury/Unknown) - Mrigyaa 1976"										
 "Suhana Safar Hain (Solo - Laxmikant Pyarelal/Anand Bakshi) - Suhana Safar 1970"										
 "Suhani Raat Dhal Chuki Na Jaane Tum Kab Aaogi (Solo - Naushad Ali/Shakeel Badayuni) - Dulari 1949"										
 "Sukh Ke Sab Saathi, Dukh Mein Na Koi, Sukh Ke Sab Saathi, Dukh Mein Na Koi, Mere Raam Mere Raam, Tera Naam Ik Sacha, Duja Na Koi, Sukh Ke Sab Saathi, Dukh Mein Na Koi  (Prayer Solo - Kalyanji-Anandji/Rajendra Krishan) - Gopi 1970 and Tere Bharose Nandlal 1991"      [Aa Aa Aa ...]										
 "Sukhi Dharti Dhool Udaaye ..Aa Ab To Aaja Bahut Din Bit Gaye Aaja (Solo - Laxmikant-Pyarelal/Majrooh Sultanpuri) - Naach Uthe Sansaar 1976"										
 "Sukhi Nahin Who Jo (Multi Geeta Dutt and Usha Mangeshkar - Chitragupt/Bharat Vyas) - Blyogi-Upmanyu 1958"										
 "Sukune Dil Jahaan, Milta Hain Sab Ko, Yeh Wohin Dar Hain, Yahaan Insaaf Hota Hain, Yehin Allah Ka Ghar Hain, Allah Hi Dega, Maula Hi Dega, Maangana Hain Jo, Maang Le Bande, Allah Hi Allah (Prayer - Bappi Lahiri) - Sangram 1976"										
 "Sulag Rahin Hain Husn Ki Sigdi (Solo - Vistas Ardeshir Balsara/Madhukar Rajasthani) - Madmast 1953"										
 "Sultane Madina Sultane (Solo - Dhumi Khan/Habeeb Sarhadi) - Rahnuma 1948"										
 "Sun Ae Mahjabeen Mujhe Tujh Se Ishq Nahin (Solo - Roshan Lal/Sahir Ludhianvi) - Dooj Ka Chand 1964"										
 "Sun E Dharthi Gagan Paatal Meri Binati Sakega Nahin Taal (Prayer - Chitragupt/Bharat Vyas) - Sakshi Gopal 1957"      [O O O O O O ...]										
 "Sun Gori Khol Zara (Duet Kamal Barot - Kalyanji-Anandji/Anand Bakshi) - Phool Bane Angarey 1963"										
 "Sun Le Chhoti Si (Solo - Ravi/Sarvar) - Nayi Maa 1960"										
 "Sun Le Tu Dil Ki Sada Pyar Se Pyar Saja Aa (Solo - S. D. Burman/Hasrat Jaipuri) - Tere Ghar Ke Samne 1963"      [O O O O O O ...]										
 "Sun Lo Kehate Hain Kya Yeh Najarein (Duet Geeta Dutt - Dilip Dholakia/Prem Dhawan) - Baghdad Ki Raatein 1962"										
 "Sun Lo Meri Fariyad (Solo - Jaani Babu Qawwal/Gauhar Kanpuri) - Aulia E Islam 1979"										
 "Sun Mere Bhai Yeh Rupaiyya Aana Payi (Solo - Iqbal Qureshi) - Banarasi Thug 1962"										
 "Sun Mere Mahi (Punjabi Duet Asha Bhosle - Sardul Kwatra/Praksh Sethi) - Charkha Chanan Da **** and Millennium Punjabi Vol. 3 **** and Satluj De Kande 1964"										
 "Sun Mere Sajana (Duet Lata Mangeshkar - Husnlal-Bhagatram/Qamar Jalalabadi) - Aansoo 1953"										
 "Sun Mere Yaar Barkhurdar Pyar Kiya Hain Aise (Solo - Unknown/Unknown) - Unknown ****"     										
 "Sun Sajna Sun Sajna I (Duet Asha Bhosle - Sonik-Omi/Verma Malik) - Apna Khoon 1978"
 "Sun Sajna Sun Sajna II (Duet Asha Bhosle - Sonik-Omi/Verma Malik) - Apna Khoon 1978"										
 "Sun Sun Mere Bhai (Solo - Iqbal Qureshi/Prem Dhawan) - Banarsi Thug 1962"										
 "Sun Sun Meri Kahani (Solo - Jamal Sen/Shamshul Huda Bihari) - Rangeela 1953"										
 "Sun Sun Paalanhare Koi (Solo - Chitragupt/Bharat Vyas) - Lakshmi Pooja 1957"										
 "Sun Sun Re Zara Insaan (Solo - Shivram/Bharat Vyas) - Sati Anusuya 1956"										
 "Sun Sun Sun O Gulabi Kali, Teri Meri Baat Ab Age Chali (Duet Asha Bhosle - Sonik-Omi/Verma Malik) - Sawan Bhadon 1970"										
 "Sun Sun Sun O Roothne Wale (Duet S. Balbir - G. S. Kohli/Anjaan) - Namasteji 1965"										
 "Sun Sun Sun Sun Zalima, Pyar Hum Ko Tum Se Ho Gaya, Dil Se Mila Le Dil Mera, Tujh Ko Mere Pyar Ki Kasam, Ja Ja Ja Ja Bewafa, Kaisa Pyar Kaisi Preet Re, Tu Na Kisi Ka Meet Re, Jhoot Tere Pyar Ki Kasam, Sun Sun Sun Zalima, Ja Ja Ja Ja Bewafa (Duet Geeta Dutt - O. P. Nayyar/Majrooh Sultanpuri) - Aar Paar I 1954"										
 "Sun To Lo Mera Afsana (Duet Lata Mangeshkar - Hansraj Behl/A. Shah) - Raat Ki Rani 1949"										
 "Sundar Ho Aisi Tum (Solo - R. D. Burman/Majrooh Sultanpuri) - Dil Ka Raja 1972"										
 "Suni Kisi Ne Be-Kahe Humari Daastan (Duet Suman Kalyanpur - Nashad Ali/Farooq Qaiser) - Qatil 1960"  (Nashad Ali was also known as Shaukat Ali, Shaukat Haidari, Shaukat Dehlvi, Shaukat Husain and Shaukat Husain Haidari.)										
 "Suni Suni Lag Rahi Hai Chandani Tere Bagair Aa Bhi Jaa Bechain Hai Yeh Zindagi (Duet Asha Bhosle - Lala Sattar) - ChhalBaaz 1969"										
 "Suniyein Suniyein Humara Fasana (Duet Geeta Dutt - Chitragupt/Anjum Jaipuri) - Daughter Of Sindbad 1958"										
 "Suniyo Araj Hamari, Prabhuji, Suniyo Araj Hamari, Duniya Ki Iss Bhari Sabha Mein Rakhiyon LAaj Murari (Non-Filmy Solo Janmashthami Prayer - Khaiyyam/Unknown) - This Is Mohd Rafi Saab -Ghazala And Bhajans **** and Tere Bharose Nandlal 1991"      [Aa Aa Aa ...]										
 "Suno Aye Duniyawalon (Duet Manna Dey - Chitragupt/Rajendra Krishan) - Film Hi Film 1983"										
 "Suno Main Daastan E Hazrat E Adam Sunata Hoon Hua Aabaad Kaise Yeh Jahan Tum Ko Batata Hoon (Naat Hazrat Adam Ka Waakiya or A story of Adam and Eve) Solo - Unknown/Unknown) - Unknown ****"      [Aa Aa Aa ….]										
 "Suno Meri Sarkar Zamana Ulta Hain, Ulta Hain, Suno Meri Sarkar Zamana Ulta Hain (Funny Dulha-Dulhan Duet Unknown - Husnlal-Bhagatram/Qamar Jalalabadi) - Chhoti Bhabhi 1950"      [Hun Ulta, Hun .Ulta, Hun ..Ulta, ..Ulta Hain ...]										
 "Suno Ramzan Ki Dastaan To Suno (Solo - Iqbal Qureshi/Hasrat Jaipuri) - Alam - Ara II 1973"										
 "Suno Re Bhaiya, Hum Laye Hain Ek Khabar Mastani, Aaj Kisi Zalim Ki Marnewali Hain, Naani, Naani, Are Naani, Oye Naani  (Solo - C. RamChandra/Kavi Pradeep) - Paigham 1959"      [Suno ...]										
 "Suno Re Bhaiya, Hum Laye Hain Ek Khabar Mastani, Aaj Kisi Zalim Ki Marnewali Hain, Naani, Naani, Are Naani, Oye Naani  (Solo - C. RamChandra/Kavi Pradeep) - Paigham 1959"      [Suno ...]										
 "Suno Seeta Ki Kahani (Solo - Salil Chowdhary/Prem Dhawan) - Biraj Bahu 1954"  										
 "Suno Suno E Duniya Walon Bapu Ki Ye Amar Kahani 1 (Non-Film Solo - Husnlal-Bhagatram/Rajendra Krishan) - Record # N 35312 / 13 ..1948"      (On the Republic Day's 7 Days-Program Rafi sang this song on 7th day in a planned 2 minute slot, which became half an hour slot with public support and Jawaharlal Nehru had full of tears in his eyes.  Nehru had invited Rafi to sing at his residence one day.)										
 "Suno Suno E Duniya Walon Bapu Ki Ye Amar Kahani 2 (Non-Film Solo - Husnlal-Bhagatram/Rajendra Krishan) - Record # N 35312 / 13 ..1948"										
 "Suno Suno E Duniya Walon Bapu Ki Ye Amar Kahani 3 (Non-Film Solo - Husnlal-Bhagatram/Rajendra Krishan) - Record # N 35312 / 13 ..1948"										
 "Suno Suno E Duniya Walon Bapu Ki Ye Amar Kahani 4 (Non-Film Solo - Husnlal-Bhagatram/Rajendra Krishan) - Record # N 35312 / 13 ..1948"										
 "Suno Suno Ek Baat Kahoon, Kahoji Piya Main Sunti Hoon, Ke Tera Mera, Kabhi Yeh Saath Na Tute, Yeh Baat Na Tute Chahe, Chahe Yeh Duniya Roothe (Duet Lata Mangeshkar - Sonik-Omi/Verma Malik) - Memsaab 1972"										
 "Suno Suno Ek Nayi Kahani, Suno Suno Ek Nayi Kahani, Suno Suno (Solo - S. Mohinder/Tanveer Naqvi) - Naata 1955"										
 "Suno Suno Gagan Ke Taarein (Duet Asha Bhosle - Govind Ram/) - Jalpari 1952"										
 "Suno Suno Hey Sun-ne-waalon Hum Andhon Ki Karoon Kahani (Solo - C. Arjun/Kavi Pradeep) - Aankh Ka Tara 1977"										
 "Suno Suno Kanyaon Ka Varnan Karata Hain Yeh Gyani (Parody Duet Mahesh Kumar (As Female Singer) - Kalyanji-Anandji/Prakash Mehra) - Haseena Maan Jayegi 1968"      [Hey ...]										
 "Suno Suno Miss Chatterjee Mere Dil Ka Matter jee B E T T E R Better (Swing Duet Asha Bhosle - O. P. Nayyar/Aziz Kashmiri) - Baharein Phir Bhi Aayengi 1966"										
 "Suno Yeh Zamane Ki Kahani (Solo - Roshan Lal) - Majboori 1985"										
 "Sur Badle Kaise Kaise Dekho Kismat Ki Shehnai, Haathon Mein Aaya Na Haath Piya Ka Kahe Ko Mehndi Rachai (Bidai Solo - Chitragupt/Rajendra Krishan) - Barkha 1959"										
 "Suraahi Daar Gardan Koyel Si Hain Aawaz Teri Har Ek Baat Pe Mujh Ko Hain Bada Naaz (Solo - Shankar-Jaikishan/Hasrat Jaipuri) - Aman 1967"										
 "Suraj Ghoome Chandra Ghoome (Solo - Sonik-Giridhar/Narendra Shrma) - Ishwar Bhakti 1951"										
 "Suraj Se Aankhen Mila (Multi Kishore Kumar, Asha Bhosle and Usha Mangeshkar - Rajesh Roshan/Anjaan) - Muqaddar 1978"										
 "Surya Pataka Ki Chhaya Mein (Duet S. Janki - T. G. Lingappa/Sarswati Kumar Deepak) - Ramayan 1960"										
 "Suye Manzil Badhaye Chala Chal (Solo - Prem Nath/Pandit Phani) - Rangbhoomi 1946"										
 "Swapn Jhade Phool Se (Solo - Roshan Lal/Neeraj) - Nai Umar Ki Nai Fasal 1965"

See also 
 List of songs recorded by Mohammed Rafi
 Recorded songs (A)
 Recorded songs (B-C)
 Recorded songs (D-F)
 Recorded songs (G)
 Recorded songs (H-I)
 Recorded songs (J)
 Recorded songs (K)
 Recorded songs (L)
 Recorded songs (M)
 Recorded songs (N)
 Recorded songs (O)
 Recorded songs (P-R)
 Recorded songs (T)
 Recorded songs (U-Z)

S
Rafi, Mohammed